Larkspur may refer to:

Botany
 Consolida, a genus of 40 annual flowering plants
 Delphinium, a genus of 300 perennial flowering plants

Locations
 Larkspur, Alberta, Canada
 Larkspur, Edmonton, Alberta, Canada
 Larkspur, California, United States 
Larkspur Landing, the city's ferry terminal
 Larkspur, Colorado, United States
 Larkspur, Virginia, United States 
 Larkspur, Faisalabad, Pakistan

Other uses
 Larkspur (horse), the winner of the 1962 Epsom Derby
 Larkspur, a RORO ferry built in Germany, launched in 1976
 Larkspur Press, an American letter-press publisher
 Larkspur radio system, used by the British Army

See also